Joseph Kamga (born 25 July 1957) is a Cameroonian football midfielder who played for Cameroon in the 1982 FIFA World Cup. He also played for Union Douala.

References

External links
FIFA profile

1957 births
Cameroonian footballers
Cameroon international footballers
Association football midfielders
Union Douala players
1982 FIFA World Cup players
Living people